Cryoturris edithae is a species of sea snail, a marine gastropod mollusk in the family Mangeliidae.

Description
The length of the shell attains 5.6 mm.

Distribution
This marine species occurs in the Caribbean Sea off Venezuela and the Grenadines

References

 Nowell-Usticke, G. W. "A supplementary listing of new shells (illustrated), revised edition, to be added to the check list of the marine shells of St. Croix." (1971).

External links
 
  Tucker, J.K. 2004 Catalog of recent and fossil turrids (Mollusca: Gastropoda). Zootaxa 682: 1–1295.

edithae